Alexandre Pantoja Passidomo (born, April 16, 1990) is a Brazilian mixed martial arts fighter, currently fighting for the UFC and is the flyweight champion of the Resurrection Fighting Alliance and Shooto Brazil. As of August 20, 2022, he is #2 in the UFC flyweight rankings.

Mixed martial arts career

The Ultimate Fighter: Tournament of Champions 
On May 11, 2016, the UFC announced that the 16 contestants for the season of this TUF would be flyweight champion fighters from various organizations around the world, with the winner being expected to have a chance to fight for the flyweight title against Demetrious Johnson. The cast was announced on July 20. The coaches for the season were the former challengers to the flyweight belt, Joseph Benavidez and Henry Cejudo, and Pantoja was from Team Cejudo.

He was ranked # 1 in Team Cejudo, and made his first fight against # 16 Team Benavidez, Brandon Moreno. The two came to interact within the house, even with Pantoja speaking Portuguese and Brandon Moreno speaking Spanish, the similarity between languages facilitated communication. In the fight, Alexandre Pantoja defeated Brandon Moreno by submission in the second round. With this victory, Pantoja went to the quarterfinals of the reality show.

Pantoja faced fellow team Cejudo member Kai Kara-France in the quarterfinals, defeating him by unanimous decision and progressing through to the semifinals.

Pantoja faced Hiromasa Ougikubo in the semifinals of the tournament and was defeated by unanimous decision, and it was soon announced that he had contracted with the UFC.

Ultimate Fighting Championship 
Alexandre made his promotional debut on January 28, 2017, at UFC on Fox 23 against Eric Shelton. He won the fight via split decision.

Pantoja faced Neil Seery on July 16, 2017 at UFC Fight Night 113. He won the fight via submission in the third round.

Pantoja faced Dustin Ortiz on January 20, 2018 at UFC 220. He lost the fight by unanimous decision.

Pantoja faced Brandon Moreno on May 19, 2018 at UFC Fight Night 129. He won the fight by unanimous decision.

Pantoja faced Ulka Sasaki on November 17, 2018 at UFC Fight Night 140. He won the fight via rear-naked choke submission in the first round.

Pantoja faced Wilson Reis on April 13, 2019 at UFC 236. He won the fight via TKO in the first round.

Pantoja faced Deiveson Figueiredo on July 27, 2019 at UFC 240. He lost the fight via unanimous decision. This fight earned him the Fight of the Night award.

Pantoja faced Matt Schnell on December 21, 2019 at UFC Fight Night 165. He won the fight via first-round knockout. The win also earned Pantoja his first Performance of the Night bonus award.

Pantojais faced Askar Askarov at UFC Fight Night 172 on July 19, 2020. He lost the fight via unanimous decision.

Pantoja was expected to face promotional newcomer and the former Rizin FF Bantamweight champion Manel Kape on December 19, 2020 at UFC Fight Night 183. However Pantoja pulled out of the fight in early December for undisclosed reasons. The fight eventually took place on February 6, 2021 at UFC Fight Night 184. Pantoja won the fight via unanimous decision.

Pantoja faced Brandon Royval on August 21, 2021 UFC on ESPN 29. He won the fight via rear-naked choke in round two. With this win, Pantoja earned the Performance of the Night award. Pantoja was meant to fight for the UFC flyweight title but a knee injury forced him out of it.

Pantoja faced Alex Perez on July 30, 2022, at UFC 277. He won the fight via a neck crank submission early in the first round. The win also earned Pantoja his third Performance of the Night award.

Championships and accomplishments
Ultimate Fighting Championship
Fight of the Night (One time) 
Performance of the Night (Third times) 
Tied (Joseph Benavidez) for second most finishes in the UFC Flyweight division history (6)
MMAJunkie.com
2019 July Fight of the Month

Mixed martial arts record

|Win
|align=center|25–5
|Alex Perez
|Submission (neck crank)
|UFC 277
|
|align=center|1
|align=center|1:31
|Dallas, Texas, United States
|
|-
|Win
|align=center|24–5
|Brandon Royval
|Submission (rear-naked choke)
|UFC on ESPN: Cannonier vs. Gastelum 
|
|align=center|2
|align=center|1:46
|Las Vegas, Nevada, United States
|
|-
|Win
|align=center|23–5
|Manel Kape 
|Decision (unanimous)
|UFC Fight Night: Overeem vs. Volkov
|
|align=center|3
|align=center|5:00
|Las Vegas, Nevada, United States
|
|-
|Loss
|align=center|22–5
|Askar Askarov
|Decision (unanimous)
|UFC Fight Night: Figueiredo vs. Benavidez 2 
|
|align=center|3
|align=center|5:00
|Abu Dhabi, United Arab Emirates
|
|-
|Win
|align=center|22–4
|Matt Schnell
|KO (punches)
|UFC Fight Night: Edgar vs. The Korean Zombie 
|
|align=center|1
|align=center|4:17
|Busan, South Korea
| 
|-
|Loss
|align=center|21–4
|Deiveson Figueiredo
|Decision (unanimous)
|UFC 240 
|
|align=center|3
|align=center|5:00
|Edmonton, Alberta, Canada
|
|-
|Win
|align=center|21–3
|Wilson Reis
|TKO (punches)
|UFC 236 
|
|align=center|1
|align=center|2:58
|Atlanta, Georgia, United States
|
|-
|Win
|align=center|20–3
|Ulka Sasaki
|Submission (rear-naked choke)
|UFC Fight Night: Magny vs. Ponzinibbio 
|
|align=center|1
|align=center|2:18
|Buenos Aires, Argentina
|
|- 
|Win
|align=center|19–3
|Brandon Moreno
|Decision (unanimous)
|UFC Fight Night: Maia vs. Usman
|
|align=center|3
|align=center|5:00
|Santiago, Chile
|
|-
|Loss
|align=center|18–3
|Dustin Ortiz
|Decision (unanimous) 
|UFC 220 
|
|align=center|3
|align=center|5:00
|Boston, Massachusetts, United States
|
|-
|Win
|align=center|18–2
|Neil Seery
|Submission (rear-naked choke)
|UFC Fight Night: Nelson vs. Ponzinibbio
|
|align=center|3
|align=center|2:31
|Glasgow, Scotland
|
|-
|Win
|align=center|17–2
|Eric Shelton
|Decision (split)
|UFC on Fox: Shevchenko vs. Peña
|
|align=center|3
|align=center|5:00
|Denver, Colorado, United States
|
|-
|Win
|align=center|16–2
|Damacio Page
|Technical Submission (triangle choke)
|AXS TV Fights: RFA vs. Legacy FC 1
|
|align=center|2
|align=center|5:00
|Robinsonville, Mississippi, United States
|
|-
|Win
|align=center|15–2
|Matt Manzanares
|Submission (rear-naked choke)
|RFA 18: Manzanares vs. Pantoja
|
|align=center|2
|align=center|2:38
|Albuquerque, New Mexico, United States
|
|-
|Win
|align=center|14–2
|Lincoln de Sá Oliveira
|Decision (unanimous)
|Shooto Brazil 45
|
|align=center|3
|align=center|5:00
|Rio de Janeiro, Brazil
|
|-
|Win
|align=center|13–2
|Daniel Araújo
|Submission (rear-naked choke)
|Watch Out Combat Show 31
|
|align=center|1
|align=center|2:13
|Rio de Janeiro, Brazil
|
|-
|Win
|align=center|12–2
|Rodrigo Favacho dos Santos
|Submission (rear-naked choke)
|MMA Fight Show - Summer Edition
|
|align=center|1
|align=center|4:29
|Arraial do Cabo, Brazil
|
|-
|Win
|align=center|11–2
|Lincoln de Sá Oliveira
|Decision (unanimous)
|Shooto Brazil 32
|
|align=center|3
|align=center|5:00
|Rio de Janeiro, Brazil
|
|-
|Win
|align=center|10–2
|Sandro Gemaque de Souza
|KO (punches)
|Fatality Arena Fight Night 1
|
|align=center|3
|align=center|3:58
|Niterói, Brazil
|
|-
|Win
|align=center|9–2
|Samuel de Souza
|TKO (elbows and punches)
|WFC 4 - Pretorian
|
|align=center|1
|align=center|1:23
|Rio de Janeiro, Brazil
|
|-
|Win
|align=center|8–2
|Bruno Azevedo
|Submission (rear-naked choke)
|Shooto Brazil 18
|
|align=center|1
|align=center|N/A
|Brasília, Brazil
|
|-
|Loss
|align=center|7–2
|Jussier Formiga
|Decision (unanimous)
|Shooto Brazil 16
|
|align=center|3
|align=center|5:00
|Rio de Janeiro, Brazil
|
|-
|Win
|align=center|7–1
|Ralph Alves
|Decision (split)
|Watch Out Combat Show 6
|
|align=center|3
|align=center|5:00
|Rio de Janeiro, Brazil
|
|-
|Win
|align=center|6–1
|Magno Alves
|KO (punch)
|Watch Out Combat Show 5
|
|align=center|1
|align=center|N/A
|Rio de Janeiro, Brazil
|
|-
|Win
|align=center|5–1
|Michael William Costa
|Decision (unanimous)
|Shooto Brazil 13
|
|align=center|3
|align=center|5:00
|Fortaleza, Brazil
|
|-
|Win
|align=center|4–1
|Bruno Moreno
|TKO (doctor stoppage)
|Shooto Brazil 12
|
|align=center|3
|align=center|4:09
|Rio de Janeiro, Brazil
|
|-
|Win
|align=center|3–1
|Gabriel Wolff
|TKO (doctor stoppage)
|Shooto Brazil 11
|
|align=center|3
|align=center|5:00
|Rio de Janeiro, Brazil
|
|-
|Loss
|align=center|2–1
|William Vianna
|Decision (split)
|Watch Out Combat Show 2
|
|align=center|3
|align=center|5:00
|Rio de Janeiro, Brazil
|
|-
|Win
|align=center|2–0
|Peterson Malfort
|TKO (punches)
|Rocinha Fight 
|
|align=center|2
|align=center|5:00
|Rio de Janeiro, Brazil
|
|-
|Win
|align=center|1–0
|Antônio Carlos
|Submission (armbar)
|Hikari Fight 
|
|align=center|1
|align=center|5:00
|Rio de Janeiro, Brazil
|
|-

|-
|Loss
|align=center|2–1
| Hiromasa Ougikubo
| Decision (unanimous)
| rowspan=3|The Ultimate Fighter: Tournament of Champions
|
|align=center|2
|align=center|5:00
| rowspan=3|Las Vegas, Nevada, United States
|
|-
|Win
|align=center|2–0
| Kai Kara-France
| Decision (unanimous)
|
|align=center|2
|align=center|5:00
|
|-
|Win
|align=center|1–0
| Brandon Moreno
| Submission (rear-naked choke)
|
|align=center|2
|align=center|3:44
|

See also
List of current UFC fighters
List of male mixed martial artists

Notes

External links
 
 

Living people
1990 births
Brazilian male mixed martial artists
Flyweight mixed martial artists
Mixed martial artists utilizing Brazilian jiu-jitsu
Sportspeople from Rio de Janeiro (city)
Ultimate Fighting Championship male fighters
Brazilian practitioners of Brazilian jiu-jitsu